The 1991–92 Detroit Red Wings season was the Red Wings' 60th season, the 66th for the franchise. The Wings made it to the second round of the playoffs before losing to the Chicago Blackhawks. The Red Wings, along with the New York Rangers and Pittsburgh Penguins, had five 30-goal scorers. This was also the first season for the now-retired NHL legend Nicklas Lidstrom.

Offseason
In the Entry Draft, the Wings picked Martin Lapointe in the first round, tenth overall. In the third round, the Wings picked their goaltender of the future, Chris Osgood.

Regular season
The Red Wings led the NHL in short-handed goals scored, with 18.

Season standings

Schedule and results

October

November

December

January

February

March

April

Playoffs
Detroit finished the regular season in first place in the Norris Division for the third time in their history, qualifying for the playoffs.  The Wings won the Division Semi-Finals (4-3) against the Minnesota North Stars but lost the Division Finals (0-4) to the Chicago Blackhawks.

Player statistics

Forwards
Note: GP = Games played; G = Goals; A = Assists; Pts = Points; PIM = Penalty minutes

Defencemen
Note: GP = Games played; G = Goals; A = Assists; Pts = Points; PIM = Penalty minutes

Goaltending
Note: GP = Games played; W = Wins; L = Losses; T = Ties; SO = Shutouts; GAA = Goals against average

Awards and records

Transactions

Draft picks
Detroit's draft picks at the 1991 NHL Entry Draft held at the Buffalo Memorial Auditorium in Buffalo, New York.

References
 Red Wings on Hockey Database

Detroit
Detroit
Detroit Red Wings seasons
Norris Division champion seasons
Detroit Red Wings
Detroit Red Wings